Tu Cuca Madre Ataca de Nuevo is the second disc from Cuca, a Mexican hard rock group originally from Guadalajara, Jalisco, recorded in 1993 in Surrey, England.

Track listing

Singles and videos  

 Mujer Cucaracha

1993 albums
Cuca (band) albums